Fetal abnormalities are conditions that affect a fetus or embryo, are able to be diagnosed prenatally, and may be fatal or cause disease after birth. They may include aneuploidies, structural abnormalities, or neoplasms. 

 Acardiac twin
 Achondrogenesis
 Achondroplasia
 Adrenal hematoma
 Agenesis of the corpus callosum
 Amniotic band syndrome
 Anal atresia
 Anencephaly
 Angelman syndrome
 Aqueductal stenosis
 Arachnoid cyst
 Arthrogryposis
 Bilateral multicystic dysplastic kidneys
 Camptomelic dysplasia
 Cardiac rhabdomyoma
 Caudal regression syndrome
 Chorioangioma
 Cleft palate
 Club foot
 Coarctation of the aorta
 Conjoined twins
 Cystic hygroma
 Dandy–Walker malformation
 Diaphragmatic hernia
 Diastrophic dysplasia
 Double outlet right ventricle
 Duodenal atresia
 Ebstein's anomaly
 Ectopia cordis
 Encephalocele
 Endocardial cushion defect
 Esophageal atresia
 Exstrophy of the bladder
 Fetal alcohol syndrome
 First arch syndrome
 Focal femoral hypoplasia
 Gastrointestinal atresia
 Gastroschisis
 Holoprosencephaly
 Hydranencephaly
 Hydronephrosis
 Hydrops fetalis
 Hypoplastic left heart syndrome
 Infantile polycystic kidney disease
 Iniencephaly
 Intracranial teratoma
 Intrauterine growth retardation
 Klippel–Trénaunay syndrome
 Limb body wall complex
 Macrosomia
 Meconium cyst
 Meconium ileus
 Microcephaly
 Multicystic dysplastic kidney
 Multiple pterygium syndrome
 Oligohydramnios
 Omphalocele
 Osteogenesis imperfecta
 Pentalogy of Cantrell
 Polydactyly
 Polyhydramnios
 Posterior urethral valves
 Renal agenesis
 Rh incompatibility
 Sacrococcygeal teratoma
 Spina bifida
 Spinal dysraphism
 Syndactyly
 Tetralogy of Fallot
 Thanatophoric dwarfism
 Transposition of the great vessels
 Triploidy
 Trisomy 13
 Trisomy 18
 Trisomy 21 (Down Syndrome)
 Turner syndrome (Monosomy X)
 Twin-to-twin transfusion syndrome
 Ureterocele
 VACTERL association
 Vein of Galen malformation
 Ventricular septal defect

References

Lists of diseases
Neonatology